Meng Jie (born 28 July 1976) is a Chinese fencer. She competed in the foil events at the 2000 and 2004 Summer Olympics.

References

1976 births
Living people
Chinese female foil fencers
Olympic fencers of China
Fencers at the 2000 Summer Olympics
Fencers at the 2004 Summer Olympics
Fencers from Shanghai
Asian Games medalists in fencing
Fencers at the 2002 Asian Games
Asian Games silver medalists for China
Medalists at the 2002 Asian Games
Universiade medalists in fencing
Universiade silver medalists for China
Medalists at the 2001 Summer Universiade
21st-century Chinese women